Bohuňov is the name of several locations in the Czech Republic:

 Bohuňov (Svitavy District), a village in the Pardubice Region
 Bohuňov (Žďár nad Sázavou District), a village in the Vysočina Region